Saw Nan was a queen consort of King Narathihapate of the Pagan Dynasty of Burma (Myanmar). She was also a niece of the chief queen Saw Hla Wun. Her son Uzana later became viceroy of Bassein.

References

Bibliography
 

Queens consort of Pagan